Dirceu Krüger (11 April 1945 — 25 April 2019) was a Brazilian footballer who played midfield. He was associated with Coritiba Foot Ball Club.

Honours
Coritiba Foot Ball Club
Campeonato Paranaense: 7 (1968, 1969, 1971, 1972, 1973, 1974 e 1975)
Torneio do Povo: 1 (1973)

References

1945 births
2019 deaths
Brazilian footballers
Association football midfielders
Coritiba Foot Ball Club players
Brazilian football managers
Coritiba Foot Ball Club managers
Footballers from Curitiba